The Sixth Day (Also Known As:Al-yawm al-Sadis) is a 1986 Egyptian comedy and drama film directed by Youssef Chahine. The film features Dalida, Mohsen Mohieddin, Shwikar, Hamdy Ahmed and Salah El-Saadany in the lead roles.

Cast
 Dalida
 Mohsen Mohieddin
 Shwikar
 Hamdy Ahmed
 Salah El-Saadany
 Mohamed Mounir
 Youssef Chahine
 Zaki Abdel Wahab

References

External links
 
 Kviff.com - Archive of films Sixth Day / Al-yom al-sadis

1986 films
French comedy-drama films
1980s Arabic-language films
1986 comedy-drama films
Egyptian comedy-drama films
Films directed by Youssef Chahine
1980s French films